A general agent is an agent, i.e., representative of another, who has a mandate of general nature.

Colonial use

In the Niger Rivers District the only senior agent, who administered the region (rather like a factor) for the National African Company Limited (which was granted a charter and renamed Royal Niger Company Chartered & Limited in 1886), was promoted in 1882 to become the first of only two general agents until it was absorbed by Southern Nigeria:
1882 - 1888   David McIntosh   (b. 1844 - d. 1888) 
1888 - 1 January 1900  Joseph Flint  (d. 1925)

Sources
WorldStatesmen- here Nigeria

See also
Agent-general
Managing general agent

Gubernatorial titles